The Cellvibrionaceae are a family of Gammaproteobacteria.

References

Gammaproteobacteria
Bacteria families